Glasgow Mid Argyll Shinty Club (GMA) is a shinty club from Glasgow, Scotland.  It is the only senior side in Glasgow and was founded in 1928. They have two men's sides and two women's sides. All GMA teams play at Peterson Park (Yoker / Garscadden).

History

Glasgow has had many clubs over the years including Glasgow Cowal and Glasgow Skye whose names reflected the Highland area from which they drew their players.  However, Glasgow Mid Argyll now draws its players from throughout Scotland.  GMA was established in 1928 and won the Camanachd Cup for the only time in 1973.

In the late 1980s the club were based at Allan Glen's Sports Centre, Bishopbriggs.

They played in the Premier Division for one season as of 2010 due to Lochside Rovers being unable to be promoted as champions due to their senior side, Oban Camanachd, already being in the top league. Relegation was confirmed early on as the club struggled to match their northern counterparts away from home although a 1–0 win over the Drumnadrochit side at Peterson Park gave the club a much needed lift.

The club have established themselves in National Division One as dangerous opponents and finished third in 2015. The club missed out on the title in 2016 to Kilmallie, but secured promotion to the Premiership. Once in the premiership GMA struggled to get a foothold and subsequently were relegated. More recently in the 2018 season, the mid-argyll men had a season of ups and downs. Having eased through the knockout rounds of the balliemore cup, they found themselves in the final, but came up against firm competition and lost out to national league 2018 champions Kilmallie. The league campaign found GMA in fourth after losing some crucial games late on in the season. However in 2019, the GMA men found themselves in second place after a great season and only 7 goals conceded in the entirety of the league run. Along with promotion to the Premiership, GMA again found themselves in the final of the balliemore. This time the opposition was Fort William, and Glasgow put up a brave fight. After dominating the majority of the game and being 2-1 up with 5 minutes to go, Fort William scored an offside goal that the referee did not pick up on to take the game to extra time, in which they came out victors 3-2.

The club has contributed several administrators to the game, including Camanachd Association presidents, Duncan Cameron and Archie Robertson.

GMA ladies
The women's team won the Valerie Fraser trophy (the women's Camanachd Cup) in 2003 against Gengarry B, then again in 2006 for the 2nd time but lost out on winning the national league title to Glengarry.  In 2007, they won the National first Division and Second Division, becoming the first team ever to win both leagues. They achieved this feat in terms of the Cups as well in 2015 when they won both the Valerie Fraser and the Challenge Cup on the same day.

Youth
The club is affiliated with several youth teams round Glasgow, Milngavie & Bearsden (who won the Under-14 National Development Trophy in 2007 and 2009), Meadowburn Bishopbriggs and Sgoil Ghàidhlig Ghlaschu AKA The Glasgow Gaels.

References

External links 

2010 Premier Season first win
 Mingavie Bearsden
 Meadowburn Shinty Club

Sports teams in Glasgow
Shinty teams
1928 establishments in Scotland
Sports clubs established in 1928